Atuna travancorica is a species of plant in the family Chrysobalanaceae. It is endemic to India.  It is threatened by habitat loss.

References

tranvancorica
Endemic flora of India (region)
Endangered plants
Taxonomy articles created by Polbot